

1980 

 August – The Nyalaland Trail opens near Punda Maria in the far north of the Park.

1981 
 April 21 – A research team collects specimens of the African lungfish Protopterus annectens brieni Poll in a small pan in the Pumbe sandveld on the border with Mozambique. This is the first record of this species in the Park as well as the Republic of South Africa.

1983 
 August - The Bushman Trail opens.

1984 
 February 24 - Berg-en-Dal rest camp officially opens.

1985 
 July - Lichtenstein's hartebeest reintroduced to the park.

1988 
 July 11 - The Gonde-Gonde incident: a park vehicle detonated a landmine a few kilometres south of Pafuri. No one was hurt.

See also 
History of the Kruger National Park
The Kruger National Park in the 1950s
The Kruger National Park in the 1960s
The Kruger National Park in the 1970s

References 

Kruger National Park